The Samsung NX 20-50mm F3.5-5.6 ED is an interchangeable camera lens announced by Samsung on September 14, 2010.

References
http://www.dpreview.com/products/samsung/lenses/samsung_20-50_3p5-5p6/specifications

020-050mm F3.5-5.6 ED
Camera lenses introduced in 2010